Milena Patricia Tomayconsa Paricanazas (born 28 September 2001) is a Peruvian footballer who plays as a midfielder for Club Universitario de Deportes. She was a member of the Peru women's national team.

International career
Tomayconsa represented Peru at two South American U-17 Women's Championship editions (2016 and 2018). At senior level, she played the 2018 Copa América Femenina.

References

2001 births
Living people
Women's association football midfielders
Peruvian women's footballers
Peru women's international footballers